Colfontaine is a municipality of Wallonia located in the province of Hainaut, Belgium.

On 1 January 2006 the municipality had 20,021 inhabitants. The total area is 13.62 km², giving a population density of 1,470 inhabitants per km².

The municipality consists of the following districts: Pâturages, Warquignies, Wasmes (town centre; it includes the village of Petit Wasmes).

References

External links
 
Official website of the municipality of Colfontaine (in French)
Independent Colfontaine website (in French)

Municipalities of Hainaut (province)